The House is the third studio album by New York-based musician Aaron Maine's Porches project. The album was released on January 19, 2018 on Domino Records. The album has features from (Sandy) Alex G, Dev Hynes, Bryndon Cook, Okay Kaya, Maya Laner, Cameron Wisch, and Peter Maine (Aaron Maine's father.)

The album's first single was "Country", released on October 11, 2017. The album's second single, "Find Me", was released on October 24, 2017.

Track listing

Charts

References 

2018 albums
Domino Recording Company albums
Porches (band) albums